Henry Clay is an American brand of cigars named after the early American politician Henry Clay (1777–1852). The cigars are currently manufactured in the Dominican Republic.

The brand is currently owned by the Spanish company Altadis, a subsidiary of Imperial Brands.

History 

The Henry Clay brand was created in the 1840s by a Cuban tobacco magnate, a Spanish emigrant Julián Álvarez Granda. The name was proposed by Álvarez when he was in the service of an employer and he maintained it once he was in business for himself.

The Henry Clay brand was nationalized during the time of the Castro regime and manufacturing was severely reduced throughout the 1960s when the Cuban government took ownership of  tobacco and cigar industries and its brands.

The Cuban business interest of Álvarez was eventually transferred to a British company named Henry Clay and Bock & Co. Ltd. which was founded in 1888. Henry Clay and Bock & Co. Ltd. became a component of the Tobacco Trust that, along with other trusts, was an object of the antitrust legislation of the United States.

In popular culture
 In the Russian and Soviet poet, playwright and actor Vladimir Vladimirovich Mayakovsky's 1925 poem  portraying issues of racism and capitalist exploitation, the setting is a Henry Clay and Bock Ltd. cigar factory in Havana.
 Maurice Leblanc's gentleman thief Arsène Lupin was noted to have used a Henry Clay cigar to conceal a reply to an invented associate as a part of his escape from jail in Arsène Lupin in Prison.
 In the film Blackmail (1929 film) the blackmailer is offered a Henry Clay cigar but chooses a Corona and gets Frank to pay for it.
 In George Simenon's novel, the book's namesake is observed by Inspector Maigret smoking a Henry Clay cigar.
 The Kurt Weill song 'Matrosen-Tango' (Sailor-Tango) includes the lyric 'Und Zigarren rauchen wir Henry Clay ... Denn andere Zigarren, die rauchen wir nicht' (And we smoke Henry Clay cigars... we don't smoke any other cigars).
 In Thomas Mann's novel Der Zauberberg Hofrat Behrens mentions to Hans Castorp that he almost died smoking "two small Henry Clay's".

References

External links
 Henry Clay at Altadis USA

Cigar brands
Imperial Brands brands